Pastavy is a city in Vitebsk Region, Belarus, and the administrative center of Pastavy District.

Location
Pastavy is located on the river Myadelki. Postavy Air Base is located 5 km west of Pastavy.

Amenities
Pastavy has a station on the railway line between Vitebsk and Vilnius, Lithuania.

History
Pastavy has several historic buildings including 18th-century houses and 19th-century church.
In 2009, Pastavy celebrated its 600th anniversary.

Within the Grand Duchy of Lithuania, Pastavy was part of Vilnius Voivodeship. In 1793, Pastavy was acquired by the Russian Empire as a result of the Second Partition of Poland.

From 1921 until 1939, Pastavy was part of the Second Polish Republic. In September 1939, the town was occupied by the Red Army and, on 14 November 1939, incorporated into the Byelorussian SSR.

From 6 July 1941 until 5 July 1944, Pastavy was occupied by Nazi Germany and administered as a part of Generalbezirk Weißruthenien of Reichskommissariat Ostland.

Notable people
People from Pastavy:
Andrey Arkhipaw (born 1995), footballer
Mikhail Babichev (born 1995), footballer
Aleksandr Brazevich (born 1973), football manager
Siarhei Navumchyk (born 1961), journalist
Koppel Pinson (1904-1961), historian
Israel Pliner (1896-1938), Soviet officer
Aleksander Rayevsky (1957-2008), test pilot

References

External links
 Local news from Pastavy 
 Photos on Radzima.org
 

Cities in Belarus
Disnensky Uyezd
Pastavy District
Populated places in Vitebsk Region
Vilnius Voivodeship
Wilno Voivodeship (1926–1939)